Late Night Tales: Bonobo is a  mix album compiled by British musician Bonobo, released on 17 November 2013 as part of the Late Night Tales series. The mix includes tracks from artists such as Nina Simone, Lapalux, Bill Evans, The Invisible and Dorothy Ashby. It also features an exclusive Bonobo cover version of Donovan’s "Get Thy Bearings".

Track listing

References

External links
 Official Bonobo website
 Official Late Night Tales: Bonobo page
 

2013 compilation albums
Bonobo